1 Macquarie Place (also known as Gateway Plaza) is a skyscraper in the Sydney central business district, located on Macquarie Place. 

The tower contains about 470,000 square feet (44,000m²) of office space.

History
In 1971, a proposal to redevelop an area in Circular Quay, Sydney was announced by a consortium of developers consisting of Hooker Corporation, Mainline Corporation and Dilingham Development Division (part of Silverton Transport and General Industries Ltd). The redevelopment project was dubbed by the consortium as Gateway Plaza. Although the project was initially proposed in 1971, construction did not begin until 1985 due to delays. Negotiations included retaining an old hotel on the site and redesigning the building as to not cast shadows on Macquarie Place Park.

The engineers during the construction phase were Norman Disney & Young.

The building was sold before completion in 1988 for $325 million to a subsidiary of National Mutual.

The British Consulate-General in Sydney is a tenant on the 16th floor.

The University of Wollongong Sydney Business School is a tenant on the 8th floor.

In 2018, Dexus engaged architectural firm Woods Bagot, engineers Taylor Thomson Whitting and builders Buildcorp to undertake a $30 million redevelopment and strengthening works of the Gateway Plaza building.

References

Office buildings in Sydney